Judge Batts may refer to:

Deborah Batts (1947–2020), judge of the United States District Court for the Southern District of New York
R. L. Batts (1864–1935), judge of the United States Court of Appeals for the Fifth Circuit